Elaphidion mayesae is a species of beetle in the family Cerambycidae. It was described by Ivie in 2007.

References

mayesae
Beetles described in 2007